Clondrohid GAA is a Gaelic Athletic Association club located outside Clondrohid, County Cork, Ireland. The club is solely concerned with the game of Gaelic football.

Honours

 Cork Senior Football Championship (2): 1891, 1892
 Mid Cork Junior A Football Championship (1): 1995
 Duhallow Junior A Football Championship (2): 1940, 1942

External links
Clondrohid GAA site

Gaelic games clubs in County Cork
Gaelic football clubs in County Cork